Mohammad Sabir (born 5 May 2001) is an Afghan cricketer. He made his first-class debut for Boost Region in the 2018 Ahmad Shah Abdali 4-day Tournament on 1 April 2018.

References

External links
 

2001 births
Living people
Afghan cricketers
Boost Defenders cricketers
Place of birth missing (living people)